Maharagama West Grama Niladhari Division is a Grama Niladhari Division of the Maharagama Divisional Secretariat of Colombo District of Western Province, Sri Lanka. It has Grama Niladhari Division Code 527C.

Maharagama and President's College, Maharagama are located within, nearby, or associated with Maharagama West.

Maharagama West is a surrounded by the Pamunuwa, Dambahena, Maharagama Town, Wattegedara, Pathiragoda and Maharagama East Grama Niladhari Divisions.

Demographics

Ethnicity 
The Maharagama West Grama Niladhari Division has a Sinhalese majority (89.1%). In comparison, the Maharagama Divisional Secretariat (which contains the Maharagama West Grama Niladhari Division) has a Sinhalese majority (95.7%)

Religion 
The Maharagama West Grama Niladhari Division has a Buddhist majority (87.2%). In comparison, the Maharagama Divisional Secretariat (which contains the Maharagama West Grama Niladhari Division) has a Buddhist majority (92.0%)

Gallery

References 

Grama Niladhari Divisions of Maharagama Divisional Secretariat